Komuravelli Mallikarjuna Swamy Temple popularly known as Komrelly Mallanna Temple is a Hindu temple located on a hill in Komuravelli village of Siddipet district in Telangana state, India. It is located near Siddipet on SH–1 Rajiv Rahadari. The primary deity is Mallanna or Mallikarjuna Swamy, a form of Shiva. The deity is also called as Khandoba by the Maharashtrian people. The temple is located about 85 kilometers from Hyderabad.

The Temple
Mallanna along with his consorts Golla Kethamma, Goddess Ganga and Medalamma, Goddess Parvati are at the main temple. The Oggu Katha singers sing the tale of Mallanna here. Devotees offer prayers to Mallanna with the help of Oggu Pujaris who draw a rangoli called as Patnam ( A form of offering prayers to Lord ) in front of Lord Mallanna inside temple and also in temple's verandah.

Large number of devotees visit the Mallanna temple during Maha Shivaratri when the Pedda Patnam  is celebrated and also during the Agni Gundaalu which is celebrated on the Sunday falling before the Ugadi.  The festive season, called as Mallanna Jatara begins from Sankranti and lasts till Ugadi. Large number of devotees offer prayers to the deity on all Sundays which falls in between Sankranti and Ugadi.

Another temple, Konda Pochamma temple is nearby which is visited by the devotees who visit Mallanna temple.

Komuravelli Mallanna story

There is no written script for the Lord Mallanna story. The story of Mallanna is sung in "Oggu Katha". In this Oggu katha, Swamy Mallanna married goddess Medallamma by facing conditions which are put up by her brothers. Goddess Medallamma is also called as Bramarambika, who is consort of Lord Shiva.

Also, in a recent offering from "Devon Ke Dev...Mahadev" mythological daily show on LifeOk TV channel, it has been shown that, Mallanna resembles to Marthand/Khandoba, an incarnation of Lord Shiva.
Sujitkumar phulari

References

Shiva temples in Telangana
Siddipet district